Lennard Freeman (born December 10, 1995; nicknamed "Mr. Feathery") is an American professional basketball player, and plays the forward position. He plays for Wonju DB Promy in the Korean Basketball League.

Personal life
Freeman was born in Washington, DC, and lived in Mouth of Wilson, Virginia. His mother is Nicole Bunn, and he has younger twin siblings Makala and Makhi.  He is 6' 8" (203 cm) tall, and weighs 264 pounds (120 kg).

Basketball career
Freeman attended Theodore Roosevelt High School in Washington, D.C., his freshman year. He then played two seasons at St. John's College High School in Maryland, earning all-conference honors in 2012. He then attended Oak Hill Academy in Virginia, averaging 8.6 points and 9.8 rebounds in 2012–13.

Freeman attended North Carolina State University ('18), playing basketball for the team for four seasons. He missed the 2016–17 season due to a lower right leg injury.

In the 2018–19 season he played at Final Spor (Turkish Basketball First League) where in 28 games he recorded 16.1 points per game, 10.7 rebounds per game (#3 in the league), 1.1 assists per game, and 1.3 steals per game.  Freeman was named League Player of the Week.

In the 2019–20 season Freeman played at Belfius Mons-Hainaut in the Belgian Euromillions League.  In 17 games he had 12.1 points per game and 8.6 rebounds per game (#2 in the league).  He was voted Eurobasket.com All-Belgian League Defensive Player of the Year, and named to the 1st Team and to the All-Star Game.

Hapoel Haifa in the Israeli Basketball Premier League signed Freeman in June 2020. He averaged 10.5 points, 8.4 rebounds, and 1.0 assist per game. In 2020–21 he was third in the Israel Basketball Premier League in two-point field goal percentage (68.7 per cent).

Freeman signed with Wonju DB Promy in the Korean Basketball League on September 16, 2021.

References 

1995 births
Living people
American expatriate basketball people in Belgium
American expatriate basketball people in Israel
American expatriate basketball people in Turkey
American men's basketball players
Basketball players from Virginia
Basketball players from Washington, D.C.
Israeli Basketball Premier League players
Lamar Cardinals basketball players
NC State Wolfpack men's basketball players
Oak Hill Academy (Mouth of Wilson, Virginia) alumni
21st-century American people